Hunan Normal University, founded in 1938, is a public university in Changsha, Hunan Province. The university is the 211 Project university, one of the country's 100 national key universities in the 21st century that enjoy priority in obtaining national funds. It is also a Chinese state Double First Class University Plan university, a major government initiative to comprehensively develop a group of elite universities into "world-first-class universities" by 2050. It is particularly reputable for its concentration on teachers education and training, foreign language studies, Chinese literature and history.

History

National Normal College 
Hunan Normal University was built on the first independent teachers' college in China, named "National Normal College," established in 1938. Its historic origin can be traced back to Yuelu Academy in Northern Song Dynasty, one of the four most prestigious academies over the last 1000 years in China. It was integrated into Hunan University in 1949.

Structure and departments 

Consisting of five campuses, the university covers a total area of 1.78 km2, with one million square meters of floor space. Most of the campuses are located near the Yuelu Mountain.

The university is divided into 23 colleges, 3 teaching departments, 51 research institutions. The university offers 74 undergraduate programs, 147 master programs, and 55 Ph.D. programs. There are 10 postdoctoral scientific research stations, 13 State Training and Research Bases or Centers and 7 key laboratories, jointly constructed by the Ministry of Education and Hunan Province, on the campus.

Since its founding, the university has educated nearly 300,000 students, including about 4,000 international students and students from Hong Kong, Macau and Taiwan. Currently, over 24,000 undergraduates, 8,000 graduates and 300 international students are studying on campus.

There are 1091 professors and associate professors at the university; among them are one academician of the Chinese Academy of Sciences and one academician of the Chinese Academy of Engineering. The university has invited about 600 scholars and experts to give lectures or conduct scientific research on campus from more than 20 countries since 2,000, and has established relations with over 80 foreign institutions of higher learning for academic exchanges.

Rankings and reputation 
In 2021, Hunan Normal University ranked 601-700th globally by the Academic Ranking of World Universities (ARWU), and ranked 685th by SCImago Institutions Rankings among research universities around the world. 

The 2022 CWTS Leiden Ranking ranked Hunan Normal University 656th in the world based on their publications for the period 2017–2020. The Nature Index 2021 Annual Tables by Nature Research ranked the university among the top 500 leading research institutions globally for the high quality of research publications in natural science.

Library
The library of the university has a collection of 3.4 million volumes, including 200,000 volumes of traditional thread binding books, and subscribes 4,700 kinds of Chinese and foreign periodicals. There are 12 academic periodicals published and distributed by the university. The university has its own publishing house called Hunan Normal University Press.

See also
High School Attached to Hunan Normal University

References

External links

Official web site
Official website in English

 
Teachers colleges in China
Universities and colleges in Changsha
1938 establishments in Asia
Universities and colleges in Hunan
Yuelu District